The 2008 Harvard Crimson football team was an American football team that represented Harvard University in the 2008 NCAA Division I FCS football season. They had an Ivy League record of 6–1 and an overall record of 9–1. They tied with Brown for the Ivy League title. Harvard averaged 17,360 fans per game.

Schedule

References

Harvard
Harvard Crimson football seasons
Ivy League football champion seasons
Harvard Crimson football
Harvard Crimson football